Matczyn  is a village in the administrative district of Gmina Bełżyce, within Lublin County, Lublin Voivodeship, in eastern Poland.

An unused airfield near the village was used in July 1944 during Operation Most III.

References

Villages in Lublin County